Josh Woods may refer to:

Josh Woods (American football), American linebacker
Josh Woods (rugby league), English rugby league player
Josh Woods (wrestler), American professional wrestler
Josh Woods (footballer), English footballer
Josh Woods (Canadian football)

See also
Southwest Airlines Flight 1248, an aviation accident which resulted in the death of a six-year-old boy called Joshua Woods